Nicola Maggie Hancock (born 8 November 1995) is an Australian cricketer who plays as a right-arm medium bowler and right-handed batter. She plays for the Queensland Fire in the Women's National Cricket League and the Brisbane Heat in the Women's Big Bash League. She has previously played for Victoria, Melbourne Renegades, Northern Districts, ACT Meteors, Hobart Hurricanes and Melbourne Stars. She has played for Australia at underage level and for their second team, the Shooting Stars.

References

External links
 

1995 births
Living people
Cricketers from Melbourne
Australian cricketers
Australian women cricketers
Australian LGBT sportspeople
LGBT cricketers
Lesbian sportswomen
ACT Meteors cricketers
Brisbane Heat (WBBL) cricketers
Hobart Hurricanes (WBBL) cricketers
Melbourne Renegades (WBBL) cricketers
Melbourne Stars (WBBL) cricketers
Northern Districts women cricketers
Victoria women cricketers
Queensland Fire cricketers